is a passenger railway station on the Minato Line in the city of Hitachinaka, Ibaraki, Japan, operated by the third-sector railway operator Hitachinaka Seaside Railway.

Lines

Station layout
The station is unstaffed and consists of a single side platform serving the single-track line.

History
Tonoyama Station opened on 17 July 1928 as a station on the Minato Railway.

Passenger statistics
In fiscal 2011, the station was used by an average of 113 passengers daily.

Surrounding area
former Nakaminato City Hall

See also
 List of railway stations in Japan

References

External links

 Hitachinaka Seaside Railway station information 

Railway stations in Ibaraki Prefecture
Railway stations in Japan opened in 1928
Hitachinaka, Ibaraki